Yuri A. Kuznetsov is a Russian-American mathematician currently the M. D. Anderson Chair Professor of Mathematics at University of Houston and Editor-in-Chief of Journal of Numerical Mathematics.

References

Year of birth missing (living people)
Living people
University of Houston faculty
Russian mathematicians
American mathematicians